Asgaran may refer to:

Askeran (town), Nagorno-Karabakh, Azerbaijan
Asgaran, Iran, a city in Isfahan Province, Iran
Asgaran, Kurdistan, a village in Kurdistan Province, Iran
Asgaran, Lorestan, a village in Lorestan Province, Iran